Tebuconazole is a triazole fungicide used agriculturally to treat plant pathogenic fungi.

Environmental Hazards
Though the U.S. Food and Drug Administration considers this fungicide to be safe for humans, it may still pose a risk. It is listed as a possible carcinogen in the United States Environmental Protection Agency Office of Pesticide Programs carcinogen list with a rating of C (possible carcinogen). Its acute toxicity is moderate. According to the World Health Organization toxicity classification, it is listed as III, which means slightly hazardous.

Due to the potential for endocrine-disrupting effects, tebuconazole was assessed by the Swedish Chemicals Agency as being potentially removed from the market by EU regulation 1107/2009.

References

External links 
 United States Estimated Annual Agricultural Pesticide Use Pesticide Use Maps - Tebuconazole

Fungicides
Lanosterol 14α-demethylase inhibitors
Triazoles